Max Peter Benedict (20 February 1920 – 20 April 1986) was an Austrian born, British film editor.

He was born in Vienna, Austria and began his film career working with the British Government during World War II. This led to his becoming a script researcher for directors Roy and John Boulting. He would later become a film editor, a translator of plays, a film critic, and a lecturer at the National Film School as well as the London International Film School.

Selected filmography
 Whistle Down the Wind (1961)
 Guns at Batasi (1964)
 The Blue Max (1966)
 Eagle in a Cage (1972)
 Shaft in Africa (1973)

References

External links

1920 births
1986 deaths
British film editors
Film people from Vienna
Austrian emigrants to the United Kingdom